Edwin Laurence Tchorzewski (April 22, 1943 – June 6, 2008) was a Canadian politician, former Saskatchewan finance minister and member of the Legislative Assembly for 25 years.

As a member of the Saskatchewan New Democratic Party, he was MLA from the Humboldt electoral district from 1971 to 1982. He later represented Regina Northeast from 1985 to 1991, and Regina Dewdney from 1991 to 1999.

Tchorzewski was born in Alvena, Saskatchewan and was educated in Hudson Bay and at the University of Saskatchewan. He taught school in Humboldt. In 1966, he married Shirley Stasiuk. Tchorzewski served in the provincial cabinet as Minister of Finance, as Provincial Secretary, as Minister of Education and as Minister of Municipal Government. In 1997, he became president of the federal NDP. He resigned his seat in the Saskatchewan assembly in 1999 to become chief of staff for Alexa McDonough. Tchorzewski became special adviser to Lorne Calvert in 2002. In 2006, he became secretary for the provincial NDP.

Tchorzewski died in Regina at the age of 65.

References

External links
 

1943 births
2008 deaths
Saskatchewan New Democratic Party MLAs
Deaths from cancer in Saskatchewan
Politicians from Regina, Saskatchewan
Presidents of the New Democratic Party of Canada
Finance ministers of Saskatchewan
Members of the Executive Council of Saskatchewan
Canadian people of Polish descent